Alessandro De Angelis joined the Society of Jesus in 1581, at the age of 22. He devoted himself to teaching at the Collegio Romano, reaching the highest level of the academic body  between 1612 and 1617, in the period of the first dispute between Galileo Galilei and the Roman Church.

He taught, as customary at that time, various disciplines from  humanities to theology and scientific disciplines ranging from logic to physics.

His only known work and for which he is remembered is In astrologos contiectores (Against astrological conjectures), published for the first time in Lyon  and then also in Rome in 1615, containing  astronomical, theological and historical arguments against astrologers and their conjectures. The book attacks in particular the theses of Gerolamo Cardano, and strongly supports free will. The work had several other re-editions in European cities including Antwerp. In this work De Angelis examines possible astral influences regarding the gestation and birth of a human being, denying any possible influence.

Works

Notes

Bibliography 
 
 L. Jacobillo, Bibliotheca Umbriae sive de scriptoribus Provinciae Umbriae, Fulginiae 1658, p. 36
 R. G. Villoslada, Storia del Collegio Romano, Roma 1954, pp. 219, 323 s., 327, 329, 332
 C. Sommervogel, Bibliothèque de la Compagnie de Yésus, I, p. 387; VIII, p. 1653

1559 births
1620 deaths
 Free will
 17th century in science
17th-century works
 Jesuit philosophers